Juan Bernal Ponce  (July 17, 1938 – January 19, 2006) was a Chilean born Costa Rican architect.

Bernal was born in Valparaíso. He went on to study at the School of Fine Arts in Viña del Mar in 1954. In 1957 he joined the School of Architecture, of the University of Chile, and in 1960 studied Architecture, at the University of Chile in Santiago, graduating in 1965.

He later moved to Costa Rica in 1974 after a brief stay in Colombia, following the fall of the government of Salvador Allende. He settled in Escazú, west of the city of San José.

He published many works on architecture and served as professor in the School of Architecture at the University of Costa Rica until shortly before his death.

References

Chilean architects
Chilean emigrants to Costa Rica
Costa Rican architects
People from Valparaíso
1938 births
2006 deaths
Academic staff of the University of Costa Rica
University of Chile alumni